Jelugireh, also rendered as Jelogireh, may refer to:
 Jelugireh-ye Olya
 Jelugireh-ye Sofla